Jędrzejów may refer to the following places:
Jędrzejów, Opole Voivodeship (south-west Poland)
Jędrzejów, Świętokrzyskie Voivodeship (south-central Poland)
Jędrzejów, Ostrowiec County in Świętokrzyskie Voivodeship (south-central Poland)